"Cinderella" is a song by contemporary Christian singer Steven Curtis Chapman from his album This Moment. In 2009, a special edition of the album titled This Moment: Cinderella Edition was released, featuring two versions of the song.

Lyrics and inspiration

The song "Cinderella" was written by Steven Curtis Chapman one night after bathing his two youngest daughters - Stevey Joy and Maria Sue - and putting them to bed. He remembers that the girls were stalling him, putting on their Cinderella gowns, and he was trying to hurry them so he could put them to bed and go to his studio to work. Chapman says he even refused to read them a story that night. But after walking out, he says he felt God telling him the name "Emily Chapman", his eldest daughter, who was in her twenties. Steven remembered how he had rushed through some moments in Emily's childhood because of his career, and remembered how he now had a chance to not do it again with his younger daughters. He then felt guilty for neglecting them and started writing the song to remind himself to cherish the moments he could with his family, no matter how brief they might be:

Chapman says he wrote the song in about an hour, which was unusual for him. Chapman says that his daughters thought it was "the greatest song ever written, because it was inspired by them, but mostly because it had the name 'Cinderella'."

Several months later, in May 2008, Chapman's youngest daughter Maria Sue died as a result of an accident in the Chapmans' driveway, and the song took on a whole new meaning for the Chapman family. While the song had originally been written as a message to love and cherish parenthood while it lasted, it acquired another message of the frailty of life and how suddenly it can change. After his daughter's death, Chapman had said he was "pretty sure [he] would never sing the song again". On July 11, while singing on stage, he felt God talking to him through all his songs, confronting him. Chapman felt that he needed to believe in the hope he proclaims in his songs, and bring that hope to others by singing the song.

Tour performances

“Cinderella,” along with other songs from This Moment, was performed during “The United Tour,” which featured both Steven Curtis Chapman and Michael W. Smith.  The tour took place from October 9, 2008 to November 8, 2008, and it was Chapman’s first tour after his daughter Maria’s death.

Dove Awards

In 2009, the song was nominated for two Dove Awards: Song of the Year and Pop/Contemporary Recorded Song of the Year, at the 40th GMA Dove Awards. Although the song did not win any of the awards, Chapman took home Artist of the Year and Songwriter of the Year. During the ceremony, Chapman also performed the song and received a standing ovation.

Chart performance

Certifications

References

External links
Cinderella on Steven Curtis Chapman official website

Songs based on fairy tales
2008 singles
Steven Curtis Chapman songs
2007 songs
Sparrow Records singles
Songs written by Steven Curtis Chapman